The 1946–47 Syracuse Nationals season was the first season of the franchise. They competed in the National Basketball League.

Roster

Regular season

Eastern Division standings

Playoffs 
Lost Eastern Division Opening Round (Rochester Royals) 3-1

References

Philadelphia 76ers seasons
Syracuse